Elis Sella (25 September 1930 Viipuri, Finland – 8 December 1992 ) was a Finnish actor.

Sella's father was Polish-Jewish and mother Lithuanian-Jewish. He was married to actress Seela Sella. The couple had two children, a son named Ariel and a daughter, Ilana.

References

External links

1930 births
1992 deaths
Actors from Vyborg
Finnish Jews
20th-century Finnish male actors
Finnish people of Lithuanian descent
Finnish people of Polish-Jewish descent